Beth Dover (born August 29, 1978) is an American actress best known for her role of Linda Ferguson on the Netflix series Orange Is the New Black. Dover also appears in Comedy Central's Another Period and Netflix's Wet Hot American Summer: Ten Years Later.

Regarding her performance as Linda Ferguson in Orange Is the New Black, Dover describes her character as a villain or an antihero remarking, "It's really fun to play a person that lives by a different code of ethics than I do."

Personal life
Dover has been married to actor Joe Lo Truglio since 2014. They have one son, Eli, who was born in 2016.

Filmography

Television

Film

Web

References

External links

American actresses
Living people
Place of birth missing (living people)
1978 births
20th-century American actresses
21st-century American actresses